Neykkarapatti railway station is located between  and .

References

Salem railway division
Railway stations in Salem district